Nikola Tasić  (Serbian Cyrillic: Никола Тасић; born September 7, 1994) is a Serbian football goalkeeper who plays for Sloga Požega.

Career
He made his professional debut for FK Sloboda Užice on 27 April 2013, in Serbian SuperLiga match versus FK Rad.

Career statistics

References

External links
 Stats at Utakmica.rs
 

Association football goalkeepers
Serbian footballers
Serbian SuperLiga players
FK Sloboda Užice players
FK Borac Čačak players
FK Dinamo Pančevo players
1994 births
Living people